Adhemar dos Santos (born 8 November 1896, date of death unknown), known as just Adhemar, was a Brazilian footballer. He played in one match for the Brazil national football team in 1917. He was also part of Brazil's squad for the 1917 South American Championship.

References

1896 births
Year of death missing
Brazilian footballers
Brazil international footballers
Association footballers not categorized by position